Attorney General Drummond may refer to:

Josiah Hayden Drummond (1827–1902), Attorney General of Maine
Lewis Thomas Drummond (1813–1882), Attorney-General of the Province of Canada
Gentner Drummond (1963- ), Attorney-General of Oklahoma

See also
General Drummond (disambiguation)